Statistics of Bahraini Premier League in the 1969–70 season.

Overview
Muharraq Club won the championship.

References
RSSSF

Bahraini Premier League seasons
Bah
1969–70 in Bahraini football